Choe Byeong-kwang (or  ; born 7 April 1991) is a South Korean racewalker. He competed in the 20 kilometres walk event at the 2015 World Championships in Athletics in Beijing, China. In 2019, he competed in the men's 20 kilometres walk at the 2019 World Athletics Championships held in Doha, Qatar. He finished in 21st place.

See also
 South Korea at the 2015 World Championships in Athletics

References

South Korean male racewalkers
Living people
Place of birth missing (living people)
1991 births
University of Suwon alumni
World Athletics Championships athletes for South Korea
Athletes (track and field) at the 2016 Summer Olympics
Athletes (track and field) at the 2020 Summer Olympics
Athletes (track and field) at the 2014 Asian Games
Athletes (track and field) at the 2018 Asian Games
Olympic athletes of South Korea
Asian Games competitors for South Korea
21st-century South Korean people